There are over 20,000 Grade II* listed buildings in England. This page is a list of these buildings in the borough of Poole in Dorset.

Poole

|}

See also
 Grade I listed buildings in Dorset

Notes

External links

Poo